The mixed team event of the FIBT World Championships 2015 was held on 1 March 2015.

First introduced at the 2007 championships, the mixed team event consists of one run each of men's skeleton, women's skeleton, 2-man bobsleigh, and 2-women bobsleigh.

Results
The race was started at 13:00.

References

Mixed team